Dave Gorman's Important Astrology Experiment is a BBC television comedy series presented by Dave Gorman which was broadcast in 2002. The studio-based show was interspersed with footage of Gorman literally taking the advice of horoscopes for 40 days and nights to see if following astrology enhances love, health and wealth, and, ultimately, happiness.

To see if his life was better for following astrology, Gorman's twin brother Nick was used as a control experiment. A panel of experts commented on the success, or otherwise, of the progress of the experiment: agony aunt Denise Robertson, TV doctor Hilary Jones, and financial advisor Alvin Hall. The studio audience voted upon whether Dave's life was turning out better as a consequence of the experiment in comparison to Nick's, with results represented as a graph.

The series was cited in a scholarly journal as an example of "television that combines humour with serious topics [which] has been increasingly evident since the 1990s" alongside The Mark Thomas Comedy Product and The Mark Steel Lectures. The show was written by Gorman and Danny Wallace, and followed from their acclaimed The Dave Gorman Collection.

Episode list

References

External links

BBC television comedy
2002 British television series debuts
2002 British television series endings